Toveyleh-ye Seyyed Taher (also Romanized as Ţoveyleh-ye Seyyed Ţāher and Ţavīleh Seyyed Ţāher' also known as Boneh Seyyed Tāher and Boneh-ye Seyyed Ţāher) is a village in Gheyzaniyeh Rural District, in the Central District of Ahvaz County, Khuzestan Province, Iran. At the 2006 census, its population was 58, in 10 families.

References 

Populated places in Ahvaz County